Anita Schjøll Brede (born 198*) is a Norwegian entrepreneur, co-founder and CEO of Iris.AI.

Early life

She grew up in Bærum, Norway.

Education
She received her Bachelor in Theatre and Communication studies. She also studied a master's degree in entrepreneurship at Chalmers University of Technology in Gothenburg. She studied later at the Singularity University in California.

Professional career
Before starting Iris.AI in 2015, Anita lead the startup Pinexo. Iris.AI is her fourth own startup. Iris.ai was founded at Ames Research Center. Iris.AI raised $2.4 million in December 2017. Users include Denmark's Leo Pharma, the University of Helsinki and universities in Norway. Admission costs the universities around 250,000 NOK a year.

Her key connections are Christine Spiten, Erna Solberg, Odd Reitan, Johann Johannson and Arne Wilhelmsen. She was a board member of the Ulstein Group in 2018. She was also a board member of Katapult Group and NORA Startup (Norwegian Artificial Intelligence Research Consortium). Iris.ai was announced as a Top 10 Semifinalist in the AI XPRIZE.

Awards
She is listed on "The World's Top 50 Women in Tech 2018" and "Europe's Top 50 Women in Tech 2018" by the magazine Forbes.

She has delivered a TEDx talk in 2016. In total, she did 2 TEDx talks.

She is alumni of 500 Startups and Tech Crunch Startup Battlefield.

References

External links
iris.ai, the website of the company
Your Science Assistant (TED Talk) 2016

Living people
1980s births
Norwegian women business executives
Chief executives in the technology industry
Norwegian women company founders